Quadrans Muralis (Latin for mural quadrant) was a constellation created by the French astronomer Jérôme Lalande in 1795. It depicted a wall-mounted quadrant with which he and his nephew Michel Lefrançois de Lalande had charted the celestial sphere, and was named Le Mural in the French atlas. It was between the constellations of Boötes and Draco, near the tail of Ursa Major, containing stars between β Bootis (Nekkar) and η Ursae Majoris (Alkaid).

Johann Elert Bode converted its name to Latin as Quadrans Muralis and shrank the constellation a little in his 1801 Uranographia star atlas, to avoid it clashing with neighboring constellations.

In 1922, Quadrans Muralis was omitted when the International Astronomical Union (IAU) formalised its list of officially recognized constellations.

Notable features 
 The variable star BP Boötis was a member of the constellation.
 39 Boötis is a double star that was transferred by Lalande into Quadrans.
 The Quadrantid meteor shower is still named after the obsolete constellation.

References

Former constellations